A Hünkâr Mahfili is a structure within the prayer hall of a mosque used for worship by the Sultan, the royal family, and high-ranking government officials. It originated in the Ottoman mosque of Turkey. Often raised, it provides privacy and protection from would-be assassins. It is often attached to a Hünkâr Kasrı.

See also 
 Maqsura

References

External links
 

Mosques